Royal Valley or variation, may refer to:

 Royal Valley High School, Hoyt, Kansas, USA
 Royal Valley Unified School District, Jackson County, Kansas, USA; see Jackson County, Kansas

See also

 
 
 Valley Royals Track & Field Club, Abbotsford, BC, Canada
 Valley (disambiguation)
 Royal (disambiguation)
 Vale Royal (disambiguation)
 Royal Gorge (disambiguation)
 Valley of the Kings (disambiguation)